The 2021–22 San Diego Toreros men's basketball team represented the University of San Diego during the 2021–22 NCAA Division I men's basketball season. The Toreros were led by head coach Sam Scholl in his fourth and final year. They played their home games at Jenny Craig Pavilion in San Diego, California as members of the West Coast Conference. They finished the season 15–16, 7–9 in WCC play to finish in seventh place. They defeated Pepperdine in the first round of the WCC tournament before losing to Portland in the second round.

On March 6, 2022, the school fired head coach Sam Scholl. On April 8, the school hired former UCLA and St. John's head coach Steve Lavin as the team's new head coach. Lavin had not coached since 2015.

Previous season
In a season limited due to the ongoing COVID-19 pandemic, the Toreros finished the 2020–21 season 3–11, 2–7 in WCC play to finish in ninth place. They lost in the first round of the WCC tournament to San Francisco.

Offseason

Departures

Incoming transfers

2021 recruiting class

Roster

Schedule and results

|-
!colspan=12 style=| Non-conference regular season

|-
!colspan=12 style=| WCC regular season

|-
!colspan=12 style=| WCC tournament

Source:

References

San Diego Toreros men's basketball seasons
San Diego
San Diego Toreros
San Diego Toreros